Gill may be a surname or given name, derived from a number of unrelated sources.

Europe 
In Europe, various cultures use the name, examples being:
 the Dutch form of the given namen Giles

 in English, Gill may be a hypocorism of a number of given names, including Giles, Julian, William, Gillian, Gilbert
 in Northern English, Scots and Norwegian, it may be a topographic name, ultimately derived from Old Norse  'ravine'; for example: Lord Gill

Indian subcontinent 

in Punjab, a clan of Jats and Ramgharias ( or ), it may be derived from the Punjabi word 'gil' meaning "moisture". According to oral history, the progenitor of the clan was a man named Gill. Shergill, Virk, and Sidhu are descendant clans of the Gill Jat clan. The name is also used by the Chuhra (Balmiki and Bhangi) caste, including the Mirasis. According to bhāt (bardic) records, the Gill Jat clan claims origin to an abandoned child found by a raja in a moist, jungle area of the wilds whom was being attended by a lion. This tale is recounted in colonial-era literature. Connections to historic and contemporary Iranic peoples, such as the ancient Gelae tribe of the Scythians and the present-day Gilaki people, and locations such as Gilan, have been suggested. There were half a million Gill Jats recorded in the 1881 British India census. The Gill Jats had a marriage custom which involved digging a hole in a muddy spring.

West Asia 

 in Hebrew, a masculine given name or byname meaning "joy, gladness" (feminine form)

East Asia 

 in Korean, a common personal name often transliterated as Gil

People with the surname Gill

A. A. Gill (Adrian Anthony Gill, 1954–2016), British newspaper columnist and writer
Adrian Gill (1937–1986), Australian meteorologist and oceanographer
Alan Gill, English vocalist, guitarist and songwriter
Albert Gill (1879–1916), English Victoria Cross recipient
Amber Gill (born 1997), English television personality and author
Amrinder Gill, (born 1976), Indian singer and actor
André Gill (1840–1885), French caricaturist
Andy Gill (1956–2020), English musician, member of the rock band Gang of Four
Anthony Gill (disambiguation), multiple people, including
Anthony Gill (basketball) (born 1992), American basketball player
Anthony Gill (political scientist) (born 1965), American political scientist
Anthony Gill (professor) (born 1972), Australian pathologist and medical researcher
Anton Gill (born 1948), English historian and novelist
Arie Gill-Glick (1930–2016), Israeli Olympic runner
Aurélien Gill (born 1933), Canadian senator
Avtar Gill, Indian Bollywood actor
Basil Gill (1877–1955), English stage and film actor
Ben Gill (born 1987), Former English Professional Footballer 
Bob Gill (disambiguation), multiple people including:
Bob Gill (artist) (born 1931), American illustrator
Bob Gill (daredevil), American motorcycle stuntman
Bobby Gill (born 1959), NASCAR driver
Brendan Gill (1914–1997), American journalist
Brian Gill, Lord Gill, Lord Justice Clerk of Scotland
Bryan Nash Gill (1961–2013), American artist
Gill (Buckinghamshire cricketer), early cricketer, given name not known
Cam Gill (born 1997), American football player
Charles Gill (disambiguation), multiple people including:
 Charles-Ignace Gill (1844–1901), Canadian Member of Parliament
 Charles Ignace Adélard Gill (1871–1918), Canadian painter and poet
Christopher Gill (born 1936), U.K. politician
Colin Gill (1892–1940), British artist
Conor Gill (born 1980), American professional lacrosse player
Craig Gill (born 1961), British musician (Inspiral Carpets)
Dante "Tex" Gill, trans brothel owner, jailed for tax evasion
David Gill (disambiguation), multiple people including:
Dave Gill, Canadian ice hockey coach
David Gill (astronomer) (1843–1914), British astronomer
David Gill (executive) (born 1957), as of 2006, the Chief Executive of Manchester United Football Club
Duane Gill, American professional wrestler, known as Gillberg
Eddie Gill (born 1978), American professional basketball player
Edmund Dwen Gill (1908–1986), Australian geologist, palaeontologist and museum curator
Eric Gill (1882–1940), artist, sculptor and typographer (creator of the typeface Gill Sans)
Ernest Gill (1877–1950), English cricketer and footballer
Eugene Gill (1898–1981), American college sports coach
Frank Gill (ornithologist) (born 1941), American ornithologist
Gaurav Gill, Indian race and rally car driver
George Gill (disambiguation), multiple people including:
George Reynolds Gill (1828–1904), English portrait painter
George Gill (cricketer) (1876–1937), English cricketer
Gugu Gill, Indian actor
Gursimrat Singh Gill, Indian footballer
Hal Gill (born 1975), American professional ice hockey player
Harry Gill (disambiguation), several people, including:
 Harry Gill (architect) (1858–1925), English architect
 Harry Gill (gymnast) (born 1881), British Olympic gymnast
 Harry Gill (politician) (1885–1955), British Member of Parliament
 Harry Gill (RAF officer) (1922–2008), British World War II fighter pilot and air vice-marshal
 Harry Pelling Gill (1855–1916) painter and art teacher in South Australia
Irving Gill (1870–1936), American architect
Jacob Gill, also known as Fable Jake and "Magic" Jake Dumas, an indie professional wrestler also working for the NWA
Jacquelyn Gill, American paleoecologist
James Gill (disambiguation), multiple people including:	
James Gill (columnist), British-born columnist
James Gill (artist) (born 1934), American pop artist
James Gill (Irish cricketer) (1911–2000), Irish cricketer
JB Gill (born 1986), English singer and farmer
Jenny Gill (born 1951), New Zealand executive
Jocelyn Gill (1916–1984), American astronomer
Joe Gill (1919–2006), American comics writer
John Gill (disambiguation), multiple people, including:
John Gill (trade unionist) (1898–1971), Irish trade unionist and Labour TD
John Gill (climber) (born 1937), mathematician and climber
John Gill (theologian) (1697–1771), Calvinist theologian
Johnny Gill (disambiguation), multiple people, including:
Johnny Gill (born 1966), American R&B singer and songwriter
Johnny Gill (baseball) (1905–1984), Major League Baseball outfielder 
Johnny Ray Gill (born 1985), American producer, stage and screen actor and director
Jordan Gill (born 1994), British boxer
Joseph Gill (disambiguation), multiple people, including:
 Joseph A. Gill (1854–1933), U. S. District Judge in Indian Territory from 1899 until 1907
 Joseph B. Gill (1862–1942), Lieutenant Governor of Illinois
 Joseph J. Gill (1846–1920), U.S. Representative from Ohio
 Joseph K. Gill (1841–1931), American retailer and publisher in Oregon
 Joseph L. Gill (1885–1972), American Democratic Party politician from Chicago, Illinois
Juan Bautista Gill (1840–1877, President of Paraguay
Kanwar Pal Singh Gill, Indian police officer, Director General of Police, Punjab
Keenu Gill (born 1990), Hong Kong cricketer
Keith Gill (disambiguation), multiple people, including:
Keith Gill (investor), known for his role in the GameStop short squeeze
Keith Gill (athletic director), commissioner of the Sun Belt Conference
Ken Gill (disambiguation), multiple people, including:
Ken Gill (1927–2009), British trade unionist
Ken Gill (bishop) (1932–2013), English Anglican bishop
Kendall Gill (born 1968), retired American professional basketball player
Kezia Gill, British musician
Kimveer Gill (1981–2006), Canadian shooter responsible for Dawson School shootings in 2006
Kultar Gill, Canadian mixed martial arts fighter
Lachhman Singh Gill, Indian politician, Chief-minister of Punjab (India)
Lesley Gill, American anthropologist
Liam Gill (rugby) (born 1992), Australian Rugby Union player
Liam Gill (snowboarder) (born 2003), Canadian snowboarder
Libby Gill, American personal coach
MacDonald Gill (1884–1947), English artist
Madge Gill, (1882–1961), English artist
Margaret Gill (1797–1864), first wife of American black actor Ira Frederick Aldridge
Mary Gill (disambiguation), several people, including
 Mary Gabriel Gill (1837–1905), New Zealand Catholic prioress
 Mary Louise Gill, American professor of classics and philosophy
 Mary Gill (politician) (born 1985), Pakistani politician
Michel Gill (born 1960), American actor
Minna Gill (1896-1964), American librarian
Moses Gill, (1734–1800), American politician
Neelam Gill, British model
Neena Gill, British member of the European Parliament
Nia Gill (born 1948), American Democratic Party politician
Nicolas Gill (born 1972), Canadian judo competitor
 Paul Gill  (born 31 May 1963 in Greenfield, Lancashire) is an English former cricketer active from 1986 to 1987 
Parm Gill (born 1974), Canadian Conservative politician
Parmjit Singh Gill (born 1966), British Liberal Democrat politician
Peter Gill (disambiguation), multiple people, including:	
Peter Gill (VC) (1831–1868), Irish Victoria Cross recipient	
Peter Gill (rugby league) (born 1964), Australian rugby league footballer
Piara Singh Gill, Indian nuclear physicist & professor
Priya Gill (born 1975), Indian Bollywood actress
R. R. Rockingham Gill (born 1944), Welsh philosophy lecturer
Raminder Gill, Canadian politician in Ontario
Richard Gill (disambiguation), multiple people, including:
Richard T. Gill, opera singer and Harvard economics professor
Richard Gill (conductor) (1941–2018), Australian conductor
Richard D. Gill (born 1951), Anglo-Dutch mathematician, statistician
Robin D. Gill (born 1951), American japanologist
Robin Gill (journalist), Canadian journalist
Samuel Thomas Gill, (1818–1880), early Australian colonial artist
Sarah Ann Gill (1795–1866), Barbadian folk hero
Shehnaaz Kaur Gill, Indian actress and singer
Shubman Gill, Indian cricketer
Slats Gill (1901–1966), American basketball and baseball coach
Stanley Gill (1926 – 1975), British computer scientist
Steve Gill, American radio talk-show host
 T. P. Gill (Thomas Patrick Gill, 1858–1931), Irish politician
 Terry Gill, British actor
 Thea Gill (born 1970), Canadian actress
 Theodore Nicholas Gill (1837–1914), American ichthyologist
 Thomas Gill (disambiguation), multiple people including:	
 Thomas Gill (politician) (1922–2009), U.S. Democratic politician	
 Thomas Gill (footballer) (born 1965), Norwegian footballer
 Thomas Gill (1788–1861), British Whig politician and industrialist
 Thomas Gill (architect) (1870–1941), American architect
 Thomas Gill (politician) (1922–2009), U.S. Representative from Hawaii, Lieutenant Governor of Hawaii
 Thomas Andrew Gill (1886–1947), American college sports coach
 Thomas Edward Gill (1908–1973), American Roman Catholic bishop
 Thomas Harry Gill (1885–1955), British politician
 Tim Gill (born 1953), American computer software entrepreneur and gay rights activist
 Tom Gill (disambiguation), several people, including
 Tom Gill (actor) (1916–1971), British actor
 Tom Gill (artist) (1913–2005), cartoonist and comic book artist best known for The Lone Ranger
 Tom Gill (public servant) (1849–1923), Under-Treasurer in South Australia
 Tom Gill (writer) (1891–1972), American forester, fiction and non-fiction author, editor of a psychiatry journal
Trenton Gill (born 1999), American football player
Turner Gill (born 1962), American college football coach
Vince Gill (born 1957), American country singer–songwriter
Warren C. Gill (1912–1987), American Coast Guardsman and politician
William Henry Gill (composer) (1839–1923), Manx musical scholar
W. Walter Gill (1876–1963), Manx scholar, folklorist and poet
Walter Gill (1851–1929), forestry administrator in South Australia

References

English-language surnames
Surnames from given names
Punjabi-language surnames